King of the Castle is a 1936 British comedy film directed by Redd Davis and starring June Clyde, Claude Dampier and Billy Milton. It was shot at Shepperton Studios.

Cast
 June Clyde as Marilyn Bean 
 Claude Dampier as Pullen 
 Billy Milton as Monty King 
 Cynthia Stock as Elsie 
 Wally Patch as Trout  
 Arthur Finn as Henry Bean  
 Paul Blake as Sir Percival Trellis  
 H. F. Maltby as Mr. Crow 
 Mavis Villiers as Billie 
 Jimmy Godden as Bailiff

References

Bibliography
 Low, Rachael. Filmmaking in 1930s Britain. George Allen & Unwin, 1985.
 Wood, Linda. British Films, 1927-1939. British Film Institute, 1986.

External links

1936 films
British comedy films
1936 comedy films
Films shot at Shepperton Studios
Films directed by Redd Davis
British black-and-white films
Films scored by Eric Spear
1930s English-language films
1930s British films
English-language comedy films